Roll call may refer to:

Noting attendance
 A taking of attendance as part of a meeting agenda
 A voting method in a deliberative assembly 
Roll call (policing), a briefing to take attendance and other purposes

Arts, entertainment and media
Roll Call, an American newspaper focusing on news from Capitol Hill and Congress 
Roll Call (Hank Mobley album), 1961 
Roll Call (IQ album), 2006
Roll Call (novel), in the Traces series by Malcolm Rose
Roll Call (film), a 1965 Soviet drama film
The Roll Call, an 1874 painting by Elizabeth Thompson
The Roll-Call, a 1918 novel in the Clayhanger Family series by Arnold Bennett
"Real Nigga Roll Call", or Roll Call, a 2004 song by Lil Jon featuring Ice Cube
The Roll-Call, English title of the 1970 Polish animated short film by Ryszard Czekała, Apel

Other uses
, an 1875 ship, later SS Laura
Roll Call Records, an American independent record label

See also

 Appellplatz (German, literally 'roll call place'), in Nazi concentration camps
 Assembly (bugle call)